Spawn is a 1983 horror novel written by Shaun Hutson.

Plot

A child named Harold Pierce is playing a game which involves burning insects, when he accidentally sets fire to his home, killing his mother and his baby brother Gordon and doing severe permanent damage to his face. He is then considered insane and spends the next thirty-five years of his life incarcerated in a mental asylum where he is haunted by his dreadful mistake years earlier. However, when the asylum is set to be demolished, and all the patients are set to be moved to a new one, the doctors believe that Pierce's condition is stable, so they decide to release him. They manage to find him a job working as a porter in a hospital.

Meanwhile, Paul Harvey, a killer imprisoned for two murders, escapes. The prison warden informs the chief of police of Exham that he believes that Harvey will return there, as it is his home town, to kill again. He orders a thorough search for Harvey, although he is not found.

Pierce slowly settles into his new job and befriends fellow porter Greives. However, one of the aspects of his job involves burning aborted foetuses in a fire, which brings back painful memories. He eventually decides that it would be wrong to burn the foetuses, so he instead decides to sneak them out when nobody is looking and bury them in a nearby field. Shortly after, there is a powerful storm which fells an electricity pylon near the site of the grave. Pierce is paranoid that the workmen repairing the pylon will discover the grave, but they do not. He later returns to inspect the grave in fear that the rain may have washed it up, and he discovers, to his horror, that three of the foetuses are still alive.

In Exham, the police continue to search for Paul Harvey. They are now even more determined to catch him as two headless corpses have been found, and they believe Harvey was the murderer. They are also convinced that he is in Exham, as a shopkeeper caught him eating food from the shelves before chasing him out with a shotgun.

Meanwhile, Pierce begins to lose his sanity and continues to hear voices in his head, telling him what to do with the foetuses. They order him to cut open his chest and let the foetuses drink his blood, which he does. Greives decides to investigate Pierce's small hut near the hospital, as he can tell something is not right with Pierce. He is horrified to discover that Pierce has passed out due to blood loss, causing him to run from the hut towards the hospital. The shock of what he has discovered, combined stress of sprinting back to the hospital, causes him to die of a heart attack.

Later on, Pierce discovers Greives' replacement attempting to burn a foetus, and tries to stop him. But he is too slow, and the foetus is thrown into the fire. Pierce collapses. He is later inspected by a female doctor called Maggie who cannot understand his obsession with not burning the foetuses, or how he received the cuts on his chest, as he will not tell her.

Meanwhile, a family are driving near the hospital, when the two children declare that they need to urinate. The father parks near a field and lets then out of the car to urinate. However they are shocked to discover the open grave where five of the foetuses are still buried. They scream, causing their father to rush to them, and when he sees the decomposing foetuses, he vomits violently. He then informs the hospital, who burn the foetuses and then dismiss Pierce, as they realise that he is responsible for the burials. Maggie is surprised to discover that two women have died of what looked like giving birth, although they were not pregnant as they had both had abortions. In the meantime Harold returns to his old, now deserted asylum.

Randall witnesses an autopsy of another headless corpse in the hospital where Pierce worked, again believing Harvey to be the murderer. Upon exiting, he encounters Maggie, who informs him that Pierce may be the killer and she tells him of Pierce's past and his actions when he worked in the hospital. Randall then visits the new asylum where Pierce's doctors work, where we learn that Pierce has never been violent or dangerous. He tells Maggie of this, and the two fall in love. He visits her flat, where they passionately have sex. He tells her that he has not been in a relationship since his wife and daughter died in a car accident.

In the meantime, several other policemen who work for Randall search an abandoned farm house, where they find Harvey. He attacks one of then with a sickle, killing him, before the others are able to subdue him. They call Randall and he makes sure that Harvey is properly restrained, before giving him a severe beating and sending him back to prison. On the journey one of the guards in the ambulance transporting Harvey undoes his straps to turn him around, as he fears he may drown in his own spit. This proves to be a mistake as Harvey knocks him and the other guards unconscious before escaping. Randall is furious at this news and orders that the police return to hunting Harvey. Another headless corpse is soon discovered, and the police initially believe that Harvey again was the murderer, although after a DNA test they are horrified to discover that the corpse is Harvey.

A witness claims to have seen the murder. Randall questions him and the witness describes that the killer had a burnt face. Realising that the killer is in fact Pierce, and not Harvey, he and Maggie rush to the abandoned asylum, where they figure Pierce is. Randall tells Maggie to wait as he enters the derelict building, and he and Pierce meet and fight, Randall is stabbed in the shoulder before he stabs Pierce in the stomach. Randall then searches the asylum and is horrified to discover the foetuses. Pierce, who survived, attacks Maggie outside in her car. She tries to radio for help but the radio runs out of power. Pierce breaks the glass and attempts to stab her, leaving her no choice but to run the car repeatedly into a tree, with Pierce in between, before the petrol begins to leak and the car catches fire. Maggie is able to escape but Pierce is trapped between the car and the tree, and burns to death. She regroups with Randall in the abandoned asylum, where he shows her the foetuses. It is revealed that the three foetuses have mind controlling powers and that two of them caused their mothers to die; and that they manipulated Pierce into killing all his victims. Randall then tries to kill the foetuses with a knife, but they try to stop him by using their mind control powers to disguise themselves as his deceased daughter. This causes him to momentarily drop the knife, before he sees through their disguise and kills all three of the foetuses.

Finally, it is revealed, that the final foetus he killed was merely an illusion, and that Maggie intends to raise the final surviving, evil foetus as her own child.

References

External links
Synopsis: Spawn

1983 British novels
British horror novels
W. H. Allen & Co. books